9 P.M. or variants may refer to:

A time on the 12-hour clock
"9 PM (Till I Come)", 1999 song by German electronic dance music producer ATB

Date and time disambiguation pages